SS Swarthmore Victory  (MCV-737) was a type VC2-S-AP2 Victory-class cargo ship built for the United States during World War II. The ship was built as part of the Emergency Shipbuilding program by Permanente Metals Corporation in Yard 2 of the Richmond Shipyards in Richmond, California. Named after Swarthmore College in Pennsylvania. Caomplete on April 7, 1945 Swarthmore Victory delivered supplies for the Pacific War and was operated by the United States Lines.

Post war 
In 1948 Catalina Wild Life Expeditions, owned by Noel Rosefelt, hired Swarthmore Victory to import animals including elephants. The four baby elephants for Tom Packs Circus in New Orleans became known to the world before coming to America. Swarthmore Victory was delayed by two typhoons coming from Siam. The ship ran out of hay for the elephants four days before landing and worms for the birds on board. So started Operation Haylift. The Swarthmore Victorys captain radioed the Naval Air Station Alameda that the ship had an emergency need of food for the hungry 6 four year elephants for a circus and tropical birds for zoos. The Navy sent a large flying boat, a Martin JRM Mars named the Marshall Mars. The plane dropped Hay and worms in waterproof bags into the ocean. The food was retrieved by the ship's crew. The six Elephants and tropical birds arrived safely in the United States. One elephant, Sue arrived at the Sacramento Zoo in November 1948 and lived at the zoo until her death in April 1989.
In 1950 she was laid up at the United States Navy reserve fleets in Astoria, Oregon.

Vietnam War
In 1966 she was removed from the Reserve Fleet and reactivated for Vietnam War and operated by the Pacific Far East Line. She delivered goods for the United States Merchant Marine, Military Sea Transportation Service, and Military Sealift Command in Vietnam. In Vietnam, in 1969 Swarthmore Victory took several direct hits from an ambush. In 1973 she was laid up at Suisun Bay Reserve Fleet. In 1988 she was scrapped at Kaohsiung.

See also
 , a similar VC2-S-AP2 Victory ship conversion into a dedicated troopship

References

World War II merchant ships of the United States
Victory ships
1945 ships